This is a list of lighthouses in Algeria. The list includes those maritime lighthouses that are named landfall lights, or have a range of at least fifteen nautical miles. They are located along the Mediterranean coastline, and on a number of Algerian islands.

Lighthouses

See also 
 List of lighthouses in Morocco (to the west)
 List of lighthouses in Tunisia (to the east)
 Lists of lighthouses and lightvessels

References

External links 

Algeria
Lighthouse
Lighthouses